Philip Hall Coombs (1915 at Holyoke, MA – February 15, 2006 in Chester, CT), is an American teacher. An undergraduate study was at Amherst College and post-grad work was at the University of Chicago.  He taught economics at Williams College and was a program director for education at the Ford Foundation.

Coombs was appointed by President John F. Kennedy to be the first Assistant Secretary of State for Education and Culture in February, 1961.  He was an advocate for overhauling the educational system, saying that every school district should put 2% of its money into educational research and hire a "Vice President in charge of heresy."   During his stint in this post, he went to live in Paris, organizing the UNESCO International Institute for Educational Planning. This UNESCO-created group advised countries on improvements to their systems of education.  Being dissatisfied with the pace of change, he resigned from the U.S. State Department in 1962 and, from 1963 to 1968, held the post of Director of the IIEP.  He served as vice-chair and chair of the International Council of Economic Development until 1992, when he retired.

During his career he wrote several books on foreign policy and education.  He was married to Helena Brooks for 65 years and had two children, Peter B. Coombs and Helena H. Weeks.

Published works

 Problems of economic mobilization (Industrial College of the Armed Forces, Washington, D.C. Economic mobilization course), by Philip H Coombs, 1947
 Education and Foreign Aid: Ways to Improve United States Foreign Educational Aid (from the Burton Lectures) by Philip H. Coombs, 1965
 The World Educational Crisis: A Systems Analysis, Oxford University Press, 1968
 Managing Educational Costs,  by Philip H. Coombs and Jacques Hallak. 1972
 Attacking Rural Poverty: How Nonformal Education Can Help, A research report for the World Bank. Edited by Barbara Baird Israel,  by Philip H. Coombs with Manzoor Ahmed, 1974
 Education for Rural Development (Praeger special studies in international economics and development) by Manzoor Ahmed and Philip H. Coombs, 1975
 Meeting the Basic Needs of the Rural Poor: The Integrated Community-Based Approach (Pergamon policy studies on international development), by Philip H. Coombs, 1980
 The World Crisis in Education: The View from the Eighties, by Philip H. Coombs, 1985
 Education and Foreign Aid: Ways to Improve United States Foreign Educational Aid (Burton Lectures) by Philip H. Coombs, 1988
 Fourth Dimension of Foreign Policy'', by Philip H Coombs, 1990

External links
 
 New York Times obituary
 Obituary from the IIEP newsletter, Apr-June, 2006
 International Institute for Educational Planning website

1915 births
2006 deaths
Amherst College alumni
University of Chicago alumni
20th-century American educators
Politicians from Holyoke, Massachusetts
Assistant Secretaries of State for Education and Culture
People from Chester, Connecticut